The Seagram murals are a series of paintings by Mark Rothko, his first to experiment with a dark palette. The paintings were originally commissioned for The Four Seasons Restaurant in New York City's Seagram Building. Rothko intended for the dark paintings to sicken the restaurant's patrons. After visiting the restaurant where his paintings were to hang, he cancelled and returned his first commission. The paintings were stored and later donated some to the Tate. Rothko made 30 in the series in his lifetime.

The paintings have been the subject of two documentaries and a play, Red, by John Logan. The paintings were defaced while hanging in the Tate Modern in 2012, for which a man received a two-year prison sentence. The culprit, Vladimir Umanets, later expressed regret for vandalising the piece, and explained he had intended to make an artistic statement.

References

Further reading

External links 

 The "Rothko Room" with Seagram murals at the Tate Britain
 Rothko Seagram murals exhibition at the Tate Modern

Paintings by Mark Rothko
Collection of the Tate galleries
1959 paintings
1958 paintings